The Elite Messieurs (translated to English: Elite Men), also known as Cameroon Basketball League, is the premier basketball league for clubs in Cameroon. The league consisted out of 12 teams in the 2022 season. Currently, the most successful team in the league is FAP.

The champions of the Elite Messieurs qualify directly to the regular season of the Basketball Africa League (BAL).

Current teams 
The following were the 12 teams for the 2022 season:

Champions

By team

In African competitions 
Each year, the champions of the league are placed for the qualifiers of the FIBA Africa Basketball League, the premiere pan-African competition. Since 2020, this league is replaced by the Basketball Africa League (BAL). The following list shows Cameroonian teams which played in a main tournament:

FIBA Africa Basketball League

Basketball Africa League

Most Valuable Player

References

External links
Elite Messieurs
Cameroon at AfroBasket.com

Basketball in Cameroon
Basketball leagues in Africa
Sports leagues in Cameroon